Reginald Badham Lodge (1852–1937) was an English ornithologist, photographer, and painter of birds.

In 1895 he received from the Royal Photographic Society the first medal ever presented for nature photography, for a photograph of a Northern lapwing (Vanellus vanellus) incubating its eggs. Eric Hosking and Harold Lowes stated their belief that this was the first photograph of a wild bird.

His brother was bird illustrator and falconry expert George Edward Lodge. Their father was Samuel Lodge, a canon of Lincoln Cathedral and rector of Scrivelsby, Lincolnshire.

Lodge was friends with Oliver G. Pike and they made trips together.

Work 

In 1903 he published Pictures of Bird Life: On Woodland Meadow, Mountain and Marsh, "with numerous colour illustrations from photographs from life by the author".

His works are among the National Trust Collections at member museums:
 One hundred photographs of bird life (1907) is in the library of Coleton Fishacre, Devon
 Bird-hunting through wild Europe (1908) is in the library of Calke Abbey, Derbyshire

The Dick Institute holds several of his bird paintings.

Gallery

Paintings

Photographs

See also
John Gould

References

1852 births
1937 deaths
19th-century English photographers
19th-century English painters
English male painters
English ornithologists
Nature photographers
Animal painters
20th-century British painters
Photographers from Lincolnshire
19th-century English male artists